Desmond D'Sa is a South African environmentalist who received the 2014 Goldman Prize.

He is known for protesting Environmental justice issues in Durban, South Africa related to access to greenspace and pollution. The region of the city where he lives is known as a "Cancer Alley" because of the 300+ industrial facilitates in the area. To address this he founded the South Durban Community Environmental Alliance. That network has been successful at opposing other polluting sites, and is advocated to prevent expansion of the Port of Durban.

In 2011 his house was firebombed for his advocacy. Raised in the Apartheid era, he was inspired to integrate environmental and social justice issues in his activism.

For his work he received an honorary doctorate from the Durban University of Technology.

References 

Goldman Environmental Prize awardees
People from Durban
South African environmentalists
Year of birth missing (living people)
Living people